Tougan is a town located in the province of Sourou in Burkina Faso. It is the capital of Sourou Province.

References

Populated places in the Boucle du Mouhoun Region